A finery forge is a forge used to produce wrought iron from pig iron by decarburization in a process called "fining" which involved liquifying cast iron in a fining hearth and removing carbon from the molten cast iron through oxidation. Finery forges were used as early as the 3rd century BC in China. The finery forge process was replaced by the puddling process and the roller mill, both developed by Henry Cort in 1783–4, but not becoming widespread until after 1800.

History
A finery forge was used to refine wrought iron at least by the 3rd century BC in ancient China, based on the earliest archaeological specimens of cast and pig iron fined into wrought iron and steel found at the early Han Dynasty (202 BC – 220 AD) site at Tieshengguo. Pigott speculates that the finery forge existed in the previous Warring States period (403–221 BC), because of the wrought iron items from China dating to that period and there was no documented evidence of the bloomery ever being used in China.  Wagner writes that in addition to the Han Dynasty hearths believed to be fining hearths, there is also pictorial evidence of the fining hearth from a Shandong tomb mural dated 1st to 2nd century AD, as well as a hint of written evidence in the 4th century AD Daoist text Taiping Jing.

In Europe, the concept of the finery forge may have been evident as early as the 13th century. However, it was perhaps not capable of being used to fashion plate armor until the 15th century, as described in conjunction with the waterwheel-powered blast furnace by the Florentine Italian engineer Antonio Averlino (c. 1400 - 1469). The finery forge process began to be replaced in Europe from the late 18th century by others, of which puddling was the most successful, though some continued in use through the mid-19th century. The new methods used mineral fuel (coal or coke), and freed the iron industry from its dependence on wood to make charcoal.

Types

There were several types of finery forges.

German forge
The dominant type in Sweden was the German forge, which had a single hearth that was used for all processes.

Walloon forge
In Swedish Uppland north of Stockholm and certain adjacent provinces, another kind known as the Walloon forge was used, mainly for the production of a particularly pure kind of iron known as oregrounds iron, which was exported to England to make blister steel.  Its purity depended on the use of ore from the Dannemora mine.  The Walloon forge was virtually the only kind used in Great Britain.

The forge had two kinds of hearths, the finery to finish the product and the chafery to reheat the bloom that was the raw material of the process.

Lancashire forge

Process
In the finery, a workman known as the "finer" remelted pig iron so as to oxidise the carbon (and silicon).  This produced a lump of iron (with some slag) known as a bloom.  This was consolidated using a water-powered hammer (see trip hammer) and returned to the finery.

The next stages were undertaken by the "hammerman", who in some iron-making areas such as South Yorkshire was also known as the "stringsmith", who heated his iron in a string-furnace.  Because the bloom is highly porous, and its open spaces are full of slag, the hammerman's or stringsmith's tasks were to beat (work) the heated bloom with a hammer to drive the molten slag out of it, and then to draw the product out into a bar to produce what was known as anconies or bar iron.  In order to do this, he had to reheat the iron, for which he used the chafery. The fuel used in the finery had to be charcoal (later coke), as impurities in any mineral fuel would affect the quality of the iron.

Slag
The waste product was allowed to cool in the hearth and removed as a "mosser".  In the Furness district they were often left as the capstone of a wall, particularly near Spark Bridge and Nibthwaite forges.

References

Sources
H. Schubert, History of British Iron and Steel Industry c.450 BC to AD 1775 (1957), 272–291.
A. den Ouden, "The Production of Wrought Iron in Finery Hearths", Historical Metallurgy 15(2) (1981), 63–87 and 16(1) (1982), 29–33.  
K-G. Hildebrand, Swedish Iron in the Seventeenth and Eighteenth Centuries: Export Industry Before Industrialization (Stockholm 1992).   
P. King, 'The Cartel in Oregrounds Iron: Trading in the Raw Material for Steel During the 18th century", Journal of Industrial History 6 (2003), 25–48.

Steelmaking
Belgian inventions
Chinese inventions
German inventions
Iron
Metallurgical processes
Metalworking